Wife Swap is an American reality television program that was first broadcast on ABC in 2004 based on the British show with the same name. In the program, two families, usually from different social classes and lifestyles, swap wives/mothers – and sometimes husbands – for two weeks. Actor John Schwab narrated the program on ABC from 2004 to 2010.

The program will usually deliberately swap wives with dramatically different lifestyles, such as a messy wife swapping with a fastidiously neat one, or a wife who only cooks vegan swapped with a non-vegan wife, documenting the cultural and social differences that the two families discover with the new family member. A spin-off series featuring celebrities debuted January 2, 2012 under the title Celebrity Wife Swap and lasted for 4 seasons.

On March 8, 2018, it was announced that CMT had picked up the series for a 10-episode reboot under its original format. However, it was later announced that the reboot was premiered on April 4, 2019 on Paramount Network.

On September 5, 2019, the series was renewed for a 20-episode twelfth season which premiered on February 13, 2020.

On September 22, 2020, Paramount Network cancelled the series, as part of the network's then-planned shift to films.

Synopsis

During the first week, the new wife must adhere to exactly the same rules and lifestyle of the wife she is replacing. Each wife leaves a house manual which explains her role in the family and the duties she holds.  This helps to determine what rules the wives will apply at the "rules change ceremony".

During the second week, the new wives are allowed to establish their own rules, and their new families must adhere to these new household rules.  It usually takes a while for the families to adjust to this policy, meanwhile the wives disburse a sum of money to the family they have become involved with, to do what the wives see fit to spend it on.

At the end of the two weeks, the two couples all meet together for the first time, and the wives, along with their husbands, discuss how they felt about the two weeks.  This often descends into personal insults and has degenerated into violence at least twice.  More often than not, however, both families reach toward a middle ground and express that they have learned from the experience. Sometimes, the table meeting is a very heartfelt and emotional time for the two families who sometimes have complete and mutual respect for each other. A few weeks later, the cameras return to record what changes have occurred since the swap.

Legal issues

Trading Spouses 
In early 2004, ABC announced a U.S. version of the British show Wife Swap, to be called Trading Moms, having outbid Fox Network for the rights for the format in the U.S. In June the same year, Fox publicized a program with an almost identical format to Wife Swap entitled Trading Spouses, which it began broadcasting on July 1. ABC then reverted to the original UK title for their series, which began on September 26. In December 2004, RDF Media sued Fox for copyright infringement for reproducing the Wife Swap format without their permission. In 2008, FOX sold the rights to the show to CMT, ending the run.

Gay swap

In November 2005, Jeffrey Bedford, a participant in the American series, sued ABC network for trading his wife for a gay man.  He accused ABC of being dishonest, not allowing him contact with his wife, and making him miss his lessons at college.  He claimed that, when he ceased participating with the production of the episode, ABC threatened that it would not tell him his wife's whereabouts and would not pay for his wife's return home. In December 2005 he sued for over $10 million, although a spokesman revealed that the contract stated the spouse could be of either gender. In 2007, the UK version began a search for more gay or lesbian swaps.

Alicia Guastaferro 
In March 2010, Alicia Guastaferro sued ABC for $100 million, claiming that her appearance and depiction on a 2008 episode of Wife Swap led to her public embarrassment and that she suffered from panic attacks and suicidal tendencies as a result. Guastaferro alleged that many of the scenes that depicted her as a "spoiled brat" were staged and that she had been purposely asked to "act a little more spoiled." The lawsuit was settled out of court later that same year and the terms were not disclosed to the press.

Notable episodes
Wife Swap has aired several unique episodes in its history.

In 2004, The Spolansky Family had a unique episode as they were the first incredibly affluent family to be shown on the program. Jodi and Steven were given immensely harsh criticism for their entitled behavior and posh-like attitude on the show, like when Steven makes sarcastic and cruel remarks about Lynn's family (the swapping wife) and her family's financial status, or when Jodi made comments about doing Lynn's job (which is chopping wood for 2 hours a day) and then proceeded to put down Brad (the husband she was swapping with) for his family's lifestyle. They live on the glamorous Upper East Side in New York City, famously seen on The CW's Gossip Girl series where Jodi Spolansky is relatively comparable to Lily Van Der Woodsen, a Manhattan socialite and philanthropist and Steven Spolansky is relatively comparable to Bart Bass, a wealthy business mogul with a harsh attitude. They both were looked upon as neglectful parents as they were never really around their children and instead either going out shopping, out to the gym, working or out to dinner with just themselves alone. This episode also included The Bradleys, a New Jersey rural farm family with low income, the complete opposite of The Spolanskys.

For their hundredth episode on March 13, 2009, the U.S. version selected 24 families to participate in a contest to reswap. Viewers voting in October 2008 picked the artistic/psychic Silver family of Florida and the storm-chasing/UFO-hunting Heenes of Colorado. The Heenes later gained notoriety in the national media when they were involved in the Balloon boy hoax. According to Denver, Colorado blogger Bill Husted, "It sounds like a good match". But, "distressingly", L.A. Times writer Jon Caramancia wrote, "it's clear they haven't learned a thing".

In 2009, an episode of Wife Swap aired featuring six-year-old Curtis Holland. In this episode, Curtis and his calorie-loving family from North Carolina experience a week at the hands of fitness instructor Joy Brown who tries to force the family to change their unhealthy lifestyle. Throughout the episode, Holland frequently voices his distaste for Joy's fitness regime. After the episode aired, Holland became very recognizable and had even been approached to film a reality show as well as advertise for a bacon company, both of which did not work out. A clip from the episode has received 12.5 million views as of June 2018. In 2015, Holland created a GoFundMe page to raise money for a car, stating that he never received any money from appearing on Wife Swap. The GoFundMe page was later removed.

Celebrity Wife Swap
In January 2012, ABC began airing a celebrity version of Wife Swap.

Season 1
The first season had 5 episode where ten celebrities and their families took part:
Tracey Gold and Carnie Wilson
Gary Busey and Ted Haggard
Dee Snider and Flavor Flav
Niecy Nash and Tina Yothers
Antonio Sabàto Jr. and Mick Foley

Season 2
On May 11, 2012, the show was renewed for a second season. The second season debuted on February 26, 2013.
The celebrities who took part were:
Kate Gosselin and Kendra Wilkinson
Coolio and Mark McGrath
Alan Thicke and Gilbert Gottfried
Bristol and Willow Palin and Joan and Melissa Rivers
Ric Flair and Roddy Piper 
Nia Peeples and Tiffany
Andy Dick and Lorenzo Lamas
Downtown Julie Brown and Lisa Leslie
Gerardo and Sisqó

Season 3
It was announced on July 31, 2013, that the series has been renewed for a thirteen episode third season. The third season began on April 15, 2014. The celebrities taking part are:

Daniel Baldwin and Jermaine Jackson
Tichina Arnold and Kelly Packard
Robin Leach and Eric Roberts
Laila Ali and Angie Stone
Angie Everhart and Pat Neely
Larry Birkhead and Hélio Castroneves
David Justice and Dweezil Zappa
Amanda Beard and Heidi Montag 
Judy Gold and Penn Jillette
Joe Piscopo and Barry Williams
Jenna von Oÿ and Jill Zarin
Tyler Christopher and Ronn Moss
Plaxico Burress and DJ Paul

Season 4
The fourth season premiered on May 20, 2015.

Jackée Harry and Traci Lords
Verne Troyer and Hines Ward
Jeremy London and David A. Siegel
Tami Roman and Kerri Walsh Jennings
Charo and Jill Whelan
Vince Neil and Gunnar Nelson
Holly Robinson Peete and Margaret Cho
Cloris Leachman and Pia Zadora
Sean Lowe and Jason Mesnick
George Hamilton and Alana Stewart and Angela Raiola
Corey Feldman and Tommy Davidson
CeCe Peniston and Kellie Williams
Robert Carradine and Terrell Owens

Syndication 
Episodes of Wife Swap air in syndication on Lifetime in the U.S., E4 in the UK and CMT in Canada.

See also 
 Wife Swap (British TV series), the original British version of the series

References

External links

2004 American television series debuts
2020 American television series endings
2000s American reality television series
2010s American reality television series
2020s American reality television series
American Broadcasting Company original programming
American dating and relationship reality television series
American television series based on British television series
American television series revived after cancellation
English-language television shows
Paramount Network original programming
Television series by Banijay